Christy McWilson  is an American singer-songwriter based in the Pacific Northwest. She has performed with the Dynette Set, the Picketts, as a solo artist, and with many other artists, including Dave Alvin and The Young Fresh Fellows.

Early life 
McWilson was born in Northern California, but spent her formative years near Downey, California. Both of her parents are musicians.

McWilson says: "I was close enough to Bakersfield to drive up and hear Merle Haggard once or twice, and was definitely, utterly, completely influenced by the Los Angeles sound of the 70s: Stone Poneys, Gram Parsons and Emmylou Harris, and Poco."

McWilson attended college in San Francisco and Sonoma, California, earning a degree in anthropology.

Career

Early career 
McWilson first recorded in the early 1980s as a singer with the Dynette Set, releasing an album and a few singles and compilation tracks in the first half of that decade, including "Seed of Love," a standout on the 1984 Rhino female-focused new wave compilation The Girls Can't Help It. That song was co-written and produced by Scott McCaughey who was a member of the Young Fresh Fellows.

After the demise of the Dynette Set, McWilson played around Seattle in some short-lived groups while adding backing to various albums by the Young Fresh Fellows. The Fellows' college radio hit "Amy Grant" particularly benefited from McWilson's sassy vocals.

Picketts 
In 1990, McWilson helped form the Picketts (originally known as the Power Mowers) who released three albums over the course of the 1990s. Led by McWilson on vocals, the band also included drummer Leroy "Blackie" Sleep and guitarists Scott McCaughey, John Olufs, and Jim Sangster. Steve Marcus was the original bassist (later Walt Singleman played bass).

The Picketts' first recording was a 7" single for the Seattle indie PopLlama Records that featured a country version of The Clash's "Should I Stay or Should I Go." Rather than play straight-ahead country, the Picketts mixed '50s rockabilly and pop with more traditional influences, such as Wanda Jackson or Merle Haggard.

Paper Doll, their debut full-length, was released in 1992 through PopLlama. A showcase at the influential Austin music festival South by Southwest led to a deal with Rounder Records, who released The Wicked Picketts in 1995. Euphonium followed on Rounder in 1996.

The Picketts eventually disbanded, but occasionally perform reunion shows.

Solo work 
As the Picketts were disbanding (more out of sloth than acrimony), longtime fan Dave Alvin approached McWilson with an offer to produce her first solo album, The Lucky One, which contains mostly original songs (many concerning her lifelong struggle with a bipolar disorder) plus a cover of Brian Wilson's "Til I Die." The Lucky One was recorded with a core band that included Alvin, Peter Buck, and Rick Shea (guitars), Bob Glaub, Walter Singleman (bass), and Don Heffington (drums). The album also featured guest appearances by Syd Straw, Rhett Miller (Old 97's), and Mike Mills (R.E.M.).

Two years later, she called on many of these musicians to help put together her second solo album, Bed of Roses.

In spring of 2015, McWilson decided to release her "old new" album Desperate Girl, which was recorded in 2004 as her marriage dissolved. As she put it: "The songs, written in the weeks leading up to and during the marriage's demise, were recorded in their full red-hot splendor. At the time it was so painful I shelved and tried to forget about it. I recently rediscovered it and realized I had an amazing portrait of that heightened time of my life."

Other projects 
McWilson also routinely participates on the Roots On The Rails tour with Dave Alvin, Cindy Cashdollar, and other artists.

McWilson's most recent recording is Six by Three, with the West Seattle 2 (drummer Blackie Sleep and bassist Walt Singleman).

Personal life 
McWilson and singer-songwriter Scott McCaughey (The Young Fresh Fellows, The Minus 5) met at San Francisco State University and moved to Seattle in 1980, eventually marrying and having a child together. The couple are no longer married.

McWilson said she prefixed her birth surname, Wilson, with "Mc" to create her stage name, McWilson.

Discography

Dynette Set

Picketts

Solo releases

Dave Alvin and Guilty Women

The Granvilles

The West Seattle 2

Other contributions

References

External links 

 Christy McWilson
 

American country singer-songwriters
American women country singers
Singer-songwriters from California
Musicians from Seattle
People with bipolar disorder
American alternative country singers
Living people
Singer-songwriters from Washington (state)
Country musicians from California
Year of birth missing (living people)
Country musicians from Washington (state)
21st-century American women